The Koninklijk Nederlands Legermuseum (Royal Dutch Army Museum) is the former national museum of the Dutch Army. Until 2013, it was located in the Armamentarium in Delft. In 2013 it was merged with the Militaire Luchtvaartmuseum (Military Aviation Museum), based on the former airbase at Soesterberg, where the new merged museum (Militaire Luchtvaart Museum) is based and where its new stores were opened on 13 May 2009 by Jeroen Sikkel, Secretary General for Defence.

History
It originated in the private collection of Frederic Adolph Hoefer, who bought Doorwerth Castle to display it to the public. It was opened there on 5 August 1913 as the Nederlandsch Artillerie Museum (Dutch Artillery Museum) by Prince Henry. The Minister of War later renamed that museum the Dutch Army Museum Foundation (of which Hoefer remained chairman until his death). Shortly after the outbreak of World War II it was decided to move the museum from Doorwerth Castle to the Pesthuis in Leiden (the latter was then being rented by the Ministry of War from the Ministry of Justice), but the war delayed the restoration work and the museum only opened in its new location in 1956.

In 1959 the Foundation was also given the Armamentarium in Delft, with the minister of Defence opening a display there in 1986 in the presence of Prince Bernhard. The museum was given its royal prefix in 1973. The museum as a whole was opened on its new Delft premises in 1989 by Beatrix of the Netherlands.

Since 2014, part of the building is temporarily used by Delft University of Technology.

References

External links

 Official page

Buildings and structures in Delft
Army museums in the Netherlands
Museums in South Holland